In four-dimensional Euclidean geometry, the snub 24-cell honeycomb, or snub icositetrachoric honeycomb is a uniform space-filling tessellation (or honeycomb) by snub 24-cells, 16-cells, and 5-cells. It was discovered by Thorold Gosset with his 1900 paper of semiregular polytopes. It is not semiregular by Gosset's definition of regular facets, but all of its cells (ridges) are regular, either tetrahedra or icosahedra.

It can be seen as an alternation of a truncated 24-cell honeycomb, and can be represented by Schläfli symbol s{3,4,3,3}, s{31,1,1,1}, and 3 other snub constructions.

It is defined by an irregular decachoron vertex figure (10-celled 4-polytope), faceted by four snub 24-cells, one 16-cell, and five 5-cells. The vertex figure can be seen topologically as a modified tetrahedral prism, where one of the tetrahedra is subdivided at mid-edges into a central octahedron and four corner tetrahedra. Then the four side-facets of the prism, the triangular prisms become tridiminished icosahedra.

Symmetry constructions 

There are five different symmetry constructions of this tessellation. Each symmetry can be represented by different arrangements of colored snub 24-cell, 16-cell, and 5-cell facets. In all cases, four snub 24-cells, five 5-cells, and one 16-cell meet at each vertex, but the vertex figures have different symmetry generators.

See also 
Regular and uniform honeycombs in 4-space:
Tesseractic honeycomb
16-cell honeycomb
24-cell honeycomb
Truncated 24-cell honeycomb
 5-cell honeycomb
 Truncated 5-cell honeycomb
 Omnitruncated 5-cell honeycomb

References 
 T. Gosset: On the Regular and Semi-Regular Figures in Space of n Dimensions, Messenger of Mathematics, Macmillan, 1900
 Coxeter, H.S.M. Regular Polytopes, (3rd edition, 1973), Dover edition,  p. 296, Table II: Regular honeycombs
 Kaleidoscopes: Selected Writings of H.S.M. Coxeter, edited by F. Arthur Sherk, Peter McMullen, Anthony C. Thompson, Asia Ivic Weiss, Wiley-Interscience Publication, 1995,  
 (Paper 24) H.S.M. Coxeter, Regular and Semi-Regular Polytopes III, [Math. Zeit. 200 (1988) 3-45]
 George Olshevsky, Uniform Panoploid Tetracombs, Manuscript (2006) (Complete list of 11 convex uniform tilings, 28 convex uniform honeycombs, and 143 convex uniform tetracombs) Model 133
 , o4s3s3s4o, s3s3s *b3s4o, s3s3s *b3s *b3s, o3o3o4s3s, s3s3s4o3o - sadit - O133

5-polytopes
Honeycombs (geometry)